Erie station may refer to:

Erie station (SEPTA), in Philadelphia, Pennsylvania
Erie–Torresdale station, in Philadelphia, Pennsylvania
Union Station (Erie, Pennsylvania)
Erie station, now Newport station, in Jersey City, New Jersey